The Ancient Monuments and Archaeological Areas Act 1979 or AMAAA was a law passed by the UK government, the latest in a series of Ancient Monument Acts legislating to protect the archaeological heritage of England & Wales and Scotland.  Northern Ireland has its own legislation.

Section 61(12) defines sites that warrant protection due to their being of national importance as 'ancient monuments'. These can be either scheduled monuments or "any other monument which in the opinion of the Secretary of State is of public interest by reason of the historic, architectural, traditional, artistic or archaeological interest attaching to it". If an ancient monument is scheduled then it gains additional legal protection.

A monument is defined as:

Damage to a scheduled monument is a criminal offence and any works taking place within one require scheduled monument consent from the Secretary of State.

The Act also provides for taking ancient monuments into the care of the Secretary of State – the concept of 'guardianship' where an ancient monument remains in private ownership but the monument is cared for and (usually) opened to the public by the relevant national heritage body.

The Act (in Part II) also introduced the concept of areas of archaeological importance (AAI), city centres of historic significance which receive limited further protection by forcing developers to permit archaeological access prior to building work starting.  As of 2004 only five city centres, all in England, have been designated AAIs (Canterbury, Chester, Exeter, Hereford and York). Part II of the Act was never commenced in Scotland.

As the provisions in AAIs are limited compared with the requirements that can be made of developers through the NPPF, and formerly its predecessors in PPS5 and PPG16, AAIs have fallen out of use.

The law is administered in England by Historic England and the Department of Culture, Media and Sport, in Scotland by Historic Environment Scotland and in Wales by Cadw.

See also
Ancient Monuments Protection Act 1882
Ancient Monuments Protection Act 1900
Ancient Monuments Protection Act 1910
Ancient Monuments Consolidation and Amendment Act 1913
Ancient Monuments Act 1931

References

External links

Historic Scotland Website – a page about Ancient Monuments of Scotland, which also includes a downloadable copy of the Act.

United Kingdom Acts of Parliament 1979
Archaeology of England
Acts of the Parliament of the United Kingdom concerning England and Wales
Acts of the Parliament of the United Kingdom concerning Scotland
Archaeology of Scotland
Archaeology of Wales
Archaeology law
Conservation in the United Kingdom